Acacia bivenosa, commonly known as two-nerved wattle, two-veined wattle or hill umbrella bush, is a species of Acacia found in northern Australia.

Other names for this species are derived from several Australian languages. The Kurrama peoples know the plant as murrurpa, murrurbaor and morama, the Panyjima call it mururru and the Nyangumarta mururr.

Description
The bark is smooth and a light grey colour. It produces yellow flowers from April to November. The simple inflorescences have globular heads with a diameter of about  containing 16 to 32 rich golden flowers. The pods have a straight to shallowly curved shape and contains glossy, dark brown to black seeds that are arranged longitudinally inside.

Taxonomy
The species was first formally described by the botanist Augustin Pyramus de Candolle in the work Leguminosae. Prodromus Systematis Naturalis Regni Vegetabilis. Synonyms for the species include Acacia elliptica, Acacia binervosa, Acacia bivenosa var. borealis and Acacia bivenosa subsp. bivenosa. It was briefly reclassified as Racosperma bivenosum in 2003 by Leslie Pedley before being reverted to the current name in 2006.

A group of Acacia known as the A. bivenosa group of plants with similar features contains 12 species including; A. ampliceps, A. bivenosa, A. cupularis, A. didyma, A. ligulata, A. rostellifera, A. salicina, A. sclerosperma, A. startii, A. telmica, A. tysonii and A. xanthina.

Distribution and habitat
It is widespread in arid areas of northern Australia. It is common in the Pilbara and Kimberley regions of Western Australia. Also found in the Northern Territory and western Queensland, north of 25°S, with an outlier on Dorre Island, Shark Bay, Western Australia. It grows in various kinds of soils, including coastal sand, on rocky hills and gullies, in shrubland and open woodland, and is often associated with spinifex.

Uses
The bush can be heavily grazed by stock, especially as a seedling. Indigenous Australians used to find edible grubs from around the roots. It is often used in land rehabilitation as a primary colonizer.
It is commercially available in seed form for garden planting in dry environments.

See also
 List of Acacia species

References 

bivenosa
Trees of Australia
Fabales of Australia
Acacias of Western Australia
Plants described in 1825
Flora of the Northern Territory
Flora of Queensland
Taxa named by Augustin Pyramus de Candolle